African Swimming Confederation (CANA) is the African Swimming Confederation: Confédération Africaine de Natation. It is the Continental Association charged with overseeing swimming for Africa. CANA was founded in 1970, with 7 members. By 2008 it had 43 members.

The 2020 Africa Zone VI swimming championship was set to be held in February 2020, but was postponed to April 2020 due to the COVID-19 pandemic.

Members

CANA is geographically divided into four (4) Zones, each of which hosts its own Age Group Championships. The Zones are as follows:

Other African FINA members:

Competitions
African Swimming Championships 
African Junior Swimming Championships
African Zone Swimming Championships (annual; multiple locations)

References

External links
 CANA website

National members of FINA
Sw
 
Sports organizations established in 1970